We Mean Business is an American reality television series that aired on the A&E cable network starting on September 6, 2008.  The program featured three regular experts: "Business Expert" Bill Rancic, a former contestant on The Apprentice; "Tech Expert" Katie Linendoll; and "Design Expert" Peter Gurski.  In each episode, the three experts helped a struggling small business owner turn his or her business around by improving business practices and enhancing the marketing of the business.  Notably, the program was sponsored by Dell, which provided all of the new technical equipment given to the businesses.

References

External links 
 
http://www.aetv.com/we-mean-business (Archive link)

2000s American reality television series
2008 American television series debuts
A&E (TV network) original programming
English-language television shows
2008 American television series endings